Glyphostoma neglecta is a species of sea snail, a marine gastropod mollusk in the family Clathurellidae.

Description
The size of an adult shell varies between 6 mm and 14 mm. The ribs are rounded, approximated, and transversely elevately striated. The color of the shell is rusty brown.

Distribution
this species occurs in the Pacific Ocean from Mexico to Ecuador.

References

External links
 

neglecta
Gastropods described in 1843